Donna Marie McDowell White (born November 29, 1948) is an American politician. She was elected to the North Carolina House of Representatives in 2016. A Republican, she has represented the 26th district (including constituents in Northern Johnston County) since 2017.

Electoral history

2020

2018

2016

Committee assignments

2021-2022 Session 
Appropriations (Vice Chair)
Appropriations - Health and Human Services Committee (Chair)
Health (Chair)
Families, Children, and Aging Policy
Education - K-12
Environment

2019-2020 Session
Appropriations (Vice Chair)
Appropriations - Health and Human Services (Chair)
Health (Chair)
Families, Children, and Aging Policy
Education - K-12 
Environment

2017-2018 Session
Appropriations
Appropriations - Health and Human Services
Health
Aging
Education - K-12
Ethics
Judiciary III

References

External links

Living people
1948 births
People from Clayton, North Carolina
People from Southport, North Carolina
Republican Party members of the North Carolina House of Representatives
21st-century American politicians
21st-century American women politicians
Women state legislators in North Carolina